Lanvéoc is a commune in the Finistère department of Brittany in north-western France. The École Navale, the French naval academy, is located here.

Climate 
Lanvéoc has a oceanic climate (Köppen climate classification Cfb).

Population
Inhabitants of Lanvéoc are called in French Lanvéociens.

See also
Communes of the Finistère department
Parc naturel régional d'Armorique

References

External links
Official website 
Mayors of Finistère Association 

Communes of Finistère